Terryville is a census-designated place (CDP) in the Town of Brookhaven, Suffolk County, New York, United States. The population was 11,849 at the 2010 census.

Geography

Demographics

As of the census of 2000, there were 10,589 people, 3,313 households, and 2,739 families residing in the CDP. The population density was 3,295.6 per square mile (1,273.7/km2). There were 3,437 housing units at an average density of 1,069.7/sq mi (413.4/km2). The racial makeup of the CDP was 91.81% White, 1.62% African American, 0.10% Native American, 2.29% Asian, 0.01% Pacific Islander, 2.67% from other races, and 1.49% from two or more races. Hispanic or Latino of any race were 7.51% of the population.

There were 3,313 households, of which 41.4% had children under the age of 18 living with them, 71.1% were married couples living together, 8.3% had a female householder with no husband present, and 17.3% were non-families. 13.6% of all households were made up of individuals, and 4.9% had someone living alone who was 65 years of age or older. The average household size was 3.18 and the average family size was 3.49.

In the CDP, the population was spread out, with 27.4% under the age of 18, 7.3% from 18 to 24, 33.5% from 25 to 44, 23.3% from 45 to 64, and 8.4% who were 65 years of age or older. The median age was 35 years. For every 100 females, there were 97.7 males. For every 100 females age 18 and over, there were 96.5 males.

The median income for a household in the CDP was $68,034, and the median income for a family was $71,160. Males had a median income of $47,500 versus $32,332 for females. The per capita income for the CDP was $24,422. About 2.1% of families and 3.2% of the population were below the poverty line, including 4.2% of those under age 18 and 1.6% of those age 65 or over.

Education
Terryville is served primarily by the Brookhaven–Comsewogue Union Free School District. However, small parts of the southern and western sections are served by the Middle Country Central School District and the Three Village Central School District, respectively.

References 

Brookhaven, New York
Hamlets in New York (state)
Census-designated places in New York (state)
Census-designated places in Suffolk County, New York
Hamlets in Suffolk County, New York